Markéta Davidová (born 3 January 1997) is a Czech biathlete. She competed in the 2018 and 2022 Winter Olympics.

Biathlon results
All results are sourced from the International Biathlon Union.

Olympic Games
0 medals

World Championships
2 medals (1 gold, 1 bronze)

*During Olympic seasons competitions are only held for those events not included in the Olympic program.
**The single mixed relay was added as an event in 2019.

Junior World Championships

World Cup

Individual victories

References

External links

1997 births
Living people
Biathletes at the 2018 Winter Olympics
Biathletes at the 2022 Winter Olympics
Czech female biathletes
Olympic biathletes of the Czech Republic
Sportspeople from Jablonec nad Nisou
Biathlon World Championships medalists